Lycodonomorphus inornatus, commonly known as the olive house snake, the black house snake, and the olive ground snake, is a species of nonvenomous snake in the family Lamprophiidae. The species is endemic to southern Africa. It is a nocturnal snake with terrestrial habits.

Description

Individuals may be dark olive to black, or uniformly light brown to olive grey-green, with a uniform or slightly lighter belly, especially the chin, throat and neck.

Distribution and habitat
The olive house snake occurs in South Africa and Eswatini, where it is found along the eastern coastal belt from the southwestern Cape through East London to the Transkei, and extending through low-veld regions of the KwaZulu-Natal, the Mpumalanga escarpment and the Limpopo Province. It inhabits coastal bushveld, fynbos and grassveld where sufficient moisture is present, and may occur close to human habitations.

Reports of occurrence from Namibia remain unconfirmed.

Ecology
L. inornatus is nocturnal and generally terrestrial, hunting on the ground. It is generally slow moving and docile but may bite when molested. Females lay 5–15 eggs. The olive house snake feeds on lizards, small rodents and other snakes. It is preyed on by various types of raptors, including the snake eagle and the secretary bird, as well as by other snakes.

References

Further reading
Boulenger GA (1893). Catalogue of the Snakes in the British Museum (Natural History). Volume I., Containing the Families ... Colubridæ Aglyphæ, part. London: Trustees of the British Museum (Natural History). (Taylor and Francis, printers). xiii + 448 pp. + Plates I-XXVIII. (Lamprophis inornatus, pp. 321–322).
Branch, Bill (2004). Field Guide to Snakes and other Reptiles of Southern Africa. Third Revised edition, Second impression. Sanibel Island, Florida: Ralph Curtis Books. 399 pp. . (Lamprophis inornatus, p. 74 + Plate 32).
Duméril A-M-C, Bibron G, Duméril A[-H-A] (1854). Erpétologie générale ou histoire naturelle complète des reptiles. Tome septième. Première partie. Comprenant l'histoire des serpents non venimeux [= General Herpetology or Complete Natural History of the Reptiles. Volume 7. First Part. Containing the Natural History of Nonvenomous Snakes]. Paris: Roret. xvi + 780 pp. (Lamprophis inornatus, new species, pp. 434–435). (in French).
Kelly CMR, Branch WR, Broadley DG, Barker NP, Villet MH (2011). "Molecular systematics of the African snake family Lamprophiidae Fitzinger, 1843 (Serpentes: Elapoidea), with particular focus on the genera Lamprophis Fitzinger 1843 and Mehelya Csiki 1903". Molecular Phylogenetics and Evolution 58 (3): 415-426. (Lycodonomorphus inornatus, new combination).

Colubrids
Reptiles described in 1854
Taxa named by André Marie Constant Duméril
Taxa named by Gabriel Bibron
Taxa named by Auguste Duméril